Qaraqaşlı (also, Garagashly) is a village and municipality in the Sabirabad District of Azerbaijan. It has a population of 1,406.

Notable natives 

 Panah Huseyn — Prime Minister of Azerbaijan (1993).

References 

Populated places in Sabirabad District